Brokey is the largest island of Breiðafjörður, Iceland. Brokey has an area 3.7 km² with its highest point 34 m above sea level. Brokey is about 1 km wide and 3.5 to 4.0 km in length.

Notable people
Jón Pétursson (1584-1667), a noted falcon hunter and pioneer in raising eider ducks and exploiting them for export.
Hans Becker, a Dane, who was an administrator. He wrote an essay on the restoration of Iceland.

References

Islands of Iceland